The Pursuit of Happiness (TPOH) is a Canadian power pop group perhaps best known for their song "I'm an Adult Now".

Beginnings
Led by Edmonton, Alberta, singer and songwriter Moe Berg, The Pursuit of Happiness were launched in 1985 when he and drummer Dave Gilby moved to Toronto, Ontario. They soon met bassist Johnny Sinclair and formed the band, adding sisters Tamara and Natasha Amabile as backing vocalists. Their debut single, "I'm an Adult Now", quickly became a smash hit across Canada in 1986, sparked by a low-budget video (made by Berg's director friend Nelu Ghiran) which made it onto the Canadian music video channel MuchMusic.

The band signed with manager Jeff Rogers (Swell) in 1986. The band did not immediately sign to a record label, but instead released another independent single, "Killed by Love", in 1988. The Amabile sisters left to concentrate on their own band, and were replaced by Kris Abbott (guitar and backing vocals) and Leslie Stanwyck (backing vocals) in early 1988.

Chrysalis Records
In 1988, they signed to Chrysalis Records. Their debut album, Love Junk, was produced by Todd Rundgren and released that year. "I'm an Adult Now" was re-recorded and re-released as a single, making it to the charts a second time. In January 1989 the song peaked at No. 6 on Billboard's alternative songs chart. It was followed by "She's So Young", which became their biggest hit single in Canada and also received radio play in the UK and became a minor hit there, and "Hard To Laugh". The album sold over 100,000 copies in Canada and was certified platinum.

The band's follow-up album with Rundgren, 1990's One Sided Story, featured the hit singles "New Language" and "Two Girls in One." Although the album did not sell as well as Love Junk it was still a significant hit for the band. 

Stanwyck and Sinclair left the band in early 1990, going on to form power pop band Universal Honey. Starting with the Spring 1990 tour for One Sided Story, Brad Barker (bass) and Susan Murumets (backing vocals) joined the lineup. Murumets left the band in 1992 in order to pursue the business side of music, and was replaced by Rachel Oldfield.

Mercury Records, then Iron Music
The band then went through difficulties with Chrysalis, and eventually followed Chrysalis president Mike Bone to Mercury Records in 1992, and released The Downward Road in 1993. Despite some success with the single "Cigarette Dangles" (the video appeared on Beavis and Butt-head), more label troubles ensued, and the band recorded their next two albums for the now-defunct Canadian label Iron Music. Oldfield left the band in 1995, and was replaced by Jennifer Foster, who in turn left the following year and was replaced by Renee Suchy.

Canadian Indies Hall of Fame, reunion shows, recent Canadian tour dates
Although the group never officially disbanded, after 1996 they did not record as a unit until 2005, when they recorded two new tracks for a greatest hits compilation.  The most recent lineup has played a few concerts over the last decade, including in a series of shows over the last week of 2005 which ended with a New Year's Eve concert in London, Ontario.  In March 2006, they were inducted into the Canadian Indies Hall of Fame.

The band reunited for the Q107 Jingle Ball on 13 December 2014, at the Phoenix Concert Theatre in Toronto, and at the Horseshoe Tavern in Toronto on 27 October 2017 as part of the Horseshoe's 70th anniversary series of shows.

To celebrate the 30th anniversary of Love Junks release, in September 2018 the band released a deluxe edition, featuring remastered versions of Love Junks 13 tunes, and a 13 additional unreleased, live, and other rare recordings. To support the deluxe album's release the band played several dates in Canada in late 2018 and in 2019, where they would play Love Junk in its entirety, along with several other favorites.

Current members
 Moe Berg – lead vocals, lead guitar, songwriting
 Kris Abbott – guitar, backing vocals (joined 1988)
 Brad Barker – bass, occasional live backing vocals (joined 1990)
 Dave Gilby – drums
 Renee Suchy – backing vocals, live percussion (joined 1996)

Former members
 Johnny Sinclair - bass, backing vocals (left 1990)
 Tam Amabile - backing vocals (left 1988)
 Tasha Amabile - backing vocals (left 1988)
 Leslie Stanwick - backing vocals (joined 1989, left 1990)
 Susan Murumets - backing vocals (touring only, 1990-91)
 Rachel Oldfield - backing vocals (joined 1992, left 1995)
 Jennifer Foster - backing vocals (joined 1995, left 1996)

Timeline

Discography

Albums

Singles

Featured on
 Beavis and Butt-Head season 2, episode 7 "Customers Suck" - "Cigarette Dangles" (music video)

References

External links
 
 Canadian Pop Music Encyclopedia
 CanConRox entry on CanadianBands.com

Musical groups from Toronto
Musical groups established in 1985
Canadian indie rock groups
Canadian power pop groups
1985 establishments in Ontario
Chrysalis Records artists